The Fania All-Stars is a musical group formed in 1968 as a showcase for the musicians on Fania Records, the leading salsa music record label of the time.

History

Beginnings
In 1964, Fania Records was founded in New York City by Jerry Masucci, an Italian-American lawyer with a love for Cuban music, and Johnny Pacheco, a flutist, percussionist and bandleader born in the Dominican Republic but raised in the South Bronx who had like minded musical tastes. Masucci later bought out his partner Pacheco from Fania Entertainment Group, Ltd. and was the sole owner until his death in December 1997.

Throughout the early years, Fania used to distribute its records around New York. Eventually success from Pacheco's Cañonazo recording would lead the label to develop its roster. Masucci and Pacheco, now executive negotiator and musical director respectively, began acquiring musicians such as Bobby Valentín, Larry Harlow, and Ray Barretto.

Success
In 1968, Fania Records created a continuously revolving line-up of entertainers known as the Fania All-Stars. They were considered some of the best Latin Music performers in the world at that time. The original lineup consisted of:

 Band Leaders: Ray Barretto, Joe Bataan, Willie Colon, Larry Harlow, Monguito, Johnny Pacheco, Louie Ramirez, Ralph Robles, Mongo Santamaria, and Bobby Valentin.
 Singers; Héctor Lavoe, Adalberto Santiago, Pete "El Conde" Rodríguez, and Ismael Miranda.
 Other Musicians; La La, Ray Maldonado, Ralph Marzan, Orestes Vilató, Roberto Rodriguez, Jose Rodriguez, and Barry Rogers.
 Special Guests; Tito Puente, Eddie Palmieri, Ricardo Ray and Jimmy Sabater.

They recorded Live At The Red Garter, Volumes 1 and 2 with this original lineup. On August 26, 1971 they recorded Fania All-Stars: Live At The Cheetah, Volumes 1 and 2.  It exhibited the entire All-Star family performing before a capacity audience in New York City's Cheetah Lounge.

Following sell-out concerts in Puerto Rico, Chicago, and Panama, the All-Stars embarked on their first appearance at New York's Yankee Stadium on August 24, 1973. The Stars performed before more than 40,000 spectators in a concert that featured Ray Barretto, Willie Colón, Edwin Tito Asencio, Rubén Blades, Larry Harlow, Johnny Pacheco, Roberto Roena, Pellín Rodríguez, Bobby Valentín, and Jorge Santana (younger brother of Carlos Santana), Celia Cruz, Héctor Lavoe, Cheo Feliciano, Ismael Miranda, Justo Betancourt, Ismael Quintana, Pete "El Conde" Rodríguez, Bobby Cruz and Santos Colón.  Live at Yankee Stadium was included in the second set of 50 recordings in the U.S. National Recording Registry, solidifying the All-Stars as "culturally, historically, and aesthetically significant."

In 1974, the All Stars performed in Zaire, Africa, at the 80,000-seat Stade du 20 mai in Kinshasa.  This was captured on film and released as Live in Africa (Salsa Madness in the UK). This Zairean appearance occurred along with James Brown and others at a music festival held in conjunction with the Muhammad Ali/George Foreman heavyweight title fight.  Footage of the performance was included in the 2008 documentary Soul Power.

To attain a wider market for salsa music, Fania made a deal with Columbia Records in the US for a series of crossover albums by the All-Stars, beginning with Delicate & Jumpy (1976), in which Steve Winwood united with the All-Stars' Pacheco, Valentin, Barreto, and Roena. During the same year, the Fania All-Stars made their sole UK appearance, at London's Lyceum Ballroom, with Winwood appearing as guest.

In 1978 the All-Stars released Live, recorded in concert on July 11, 1975 at San Juan's Roberto Clemente Coliseum. In 1979, they travelled to Havana, Cuba, to participate in the Havana Jam festival that took place between 2–4 March, alongside Rita Coolidge, Kris Kristofferson, Stephen Stills, the CBS Jazz All-Stars, Trio of Doom, Billy Swan, Bonnie Bramlett, Weather Report, and Billy Joel, plus Cuban artists such as Irakere, Pacho Alonso, Tata Güines, and Orquesta Aragón. Their performance is captured on Ernesto Juan Castellanos's documentary Havana Jam '79. During the same year the All-Stars released  Crossover and Havana Jam on Fania, which came from a concert recorded in Havana on March 2.

Legacy
In May 2007 Ruben Blades was sued by his former bandmate, Willie Colón, for breach of contract. This led to a series of suits and countersuits that lasted over five years. A book titled Decisiones detailing the inside story of this legal battle was written by Blades' former agent, Robert J. Morgalo, and published in 2016 in English and Spanish website. The court documents can be read here and full transcripts of depositions and court rulings can be seen here.

In 2008, Cheo Feliciano celebrated his 50 years in the music industry by hosting a concert at Madison Square Garden, where then New York City Mayor Bloomberg declared July 20 "Cheo Feliciano Day" in New York.

In 2009, a historical documentary, Latin Music USA, shown on PBS TV, featured an episode on the Fania All-Stars, their evolution, career, and later demise. In 2009 as well, the All-Stars returned to the stage, opening Carlos Santana's world tour in Bogotá, Colombia. The presentation caused mixed feelings inside the salsa circle though, mainly because they were treated as seconds by the concert's organizers.

In March 2011, and subsequently in November 2012, a limited roster of the All-Stars performed in Lima, Peru. One thing to note about the 2012 performance is the return of Ruben Blades. Ismael Quintana was not present in the November 2012 performance though, as well as Yomo Toro (Yomo died in Q3 2012). In October 2013, a new, complete roster of the All-Stars performed in San Juan Puerto Rico, celebrating the 40th anniversary of their first performance in San Juan. This roster included the return of Orestes Vilato and Luigi Texidor, as well as the participation of Andy Montañez, Cita Rodriguez (Pete's daughter) and Willie Colón. This was Cheo Feliciano's last performance with the All-Stars before dying in a car accident in April 2014 in San Juan, Puerto Rico. In 2015 the Fania All-Stars were chosen to receive ASCAP's honorary Latin Heritage Award. The All-Stars were set to perform in Central Park, New York City on August 24 as part of the closing of the 50th anniversary celebration of the legendary Fania Records label.

In 2019, many of the classic Fania records were re-issued in vinyl as part of the renewed interest in the vinyl record format.

Discography

Studio albums

A Tribute to Tito Rodríguez (Fania, 1977)
Delicate and Jumpy (Columbia, 1976)
Rhythm Machine (Columbia, 1977)
Spanish Fever (CBS, 1978)
Cross Over (CBS, 1979)
California Jam (Musica Latina, 1980)
Commitment (FNA, 1980)
Latin Connection (Fania, 1981)
Social Change (Fania, 1981)
Lo Que Pide la Gente (StyllaPhone, 1984)
Viva la Charanga (Sterns, 1986)
Bamboleo (Caliente, 1988)
Latin Jazz Fusion (Charly, 1988)
Guasasa (Fania, 1989)
Bravo 97 (Sony International, 1997)

Live albums

Live at the Red Garter, Vol. 1 (Fania, 1968)
Live at the Red Garter, Vol. 2 (Fania, 1969)
Live at the Cheetah, Vol. 1 (Fania, 1972)
Live at the Cheetah, Vol. 2 (Fania, 1972)
Latin-Soul-Rock (Fania, 1974)
Fania All-Stars (Island, 1975)
Live in Japan 76 (Fania, 1976)
Live at Yankee Stadium, Vol. 1 (Fania, 1976)
Live at Yankee Stadium, Vol. 2 (Fania, 1976)
Live (Fania, 1978) 
Habana Jam (Fania, 1979) 
Live in Africa (Fania, 1986)

Filmography

Our Latin Thing (Fania 1972)
Salsa (Fania, 1974)
In Africa (Fania, 1993)
Live (Fania, 1995)

References

External links
 Fania All-Stars at SalsaClasica.com (Biography, Discography, Lyrics, etc.)

 Fania All-Stars profile
 Fania Records
 

Salsa music groups
Latin jazz ensembles
American jazz ensembles from New York City
Musical groups established in 1968
Fania Records artists
Musical groups from New York City
Jazz musicians from New York (state)
1968 establishments in New York City